The Syrian women's national rugby sevens team is Syria's representative in women's rugby sevens. Syria competed at the 2021 Arab Rugby Sevens women's tournament. They placed fourth at the 2021 West Asia Rugby Women's Sevens.

Honours

West Asia Rugby Sevens Series
Fourth: 2021
Arab Rugby Sevens Series
Runners-up: 2021
Jordanian Rugby Sevens Tournament
Champions: 2022

Tournament record

Asia Cup Sevens

Arab Cup Sevens

Current squad

Syria's roster of 12 athletes was named on 17 February 2023.

Head coach: Maria Carolina Bravo
Assistant coach: Sarah Abd Elbaki

Sarah Abd Elbaki
Alyamama Abou Ras
Lunar Al Samran
Raneem Al Safadi
Raghad Abo Ammar
Doha Al Melhem
Ruba Refaah
Nicole Al Zrawi
Hala Al Awar
Neven Al Ghadban
Alaa Saray Adleen
Amal Nassr

See also
Rugby union in Syria

References

Women's national rugby sevens teams
Rugby sevens